Peace, Vol. II is the fourth studio album by California-based worship collective Bethel Music. It was released on November 12, 2021, through its own imprint label, Bethel Music. The featured worship leaders on the album are Jenn Johnson, Jonathan David & Melissa Helser, Brandon Lake, Brian Johnson, Bethany Wohrle, and Dante Bowe, with guest appearances by Lauren Daigle, We the Kingdom, Pat Barrett, Phil Wickham, and Edward Rivera. Ed Cash collaborated with and Steven Taylor in the production of the album.

Peace, Vol. II debuted at number 32 on Billboard's Top Christian Albums Chart in the United States.

Background
On November 3, 2021, Bethel Music announced that they will be releasing Peace, Vol. II will be released on November 12, 2021. Peace, Vol. II is a follow-up to the critically acclaimed album Peace (2020), a collection of re-imagined versions of ten renowned worship songs and two original songs.

Recording, production
Similar in production style to its predecessor, Peace, Vol. II was recorded using bi-lateral audio, with frequencies scientifically proven to reduce stress and anxiety. Ed Cash, commented on the outcome of the album, saying:

Reception

Critical response

Joshua Andre in his 365 Days of Inspiring Media review gave a positive review of the album, noting that Peace, Vol. II follows "follows in the trend of Peace," then concluding "A brilliant album, and a project I will listen to again and again and again." JubileeCast's Timothy Yap wrote a favourable review of the album, declaring that "Overall, this is a solid album of 12 tracks (many of them are already familiar) re-imagined bringing calmness to our troubled souls. To this end, they succeed with flying colors."

Accolades

Commercial performance
In the United States, Peace, Vol. II launched at number 32 on the Top Christian Albums Chart dated November 27, 2021.

Track listing

Charts

Release history

References

External links
  on PraiseCharts

2021 albums
Bethel Music albums